Dyschirius aida is a species of ground beetle in the subfamily Scaritinae. It was described by Schatzmayr in 1936.

References

aida
Beetles described in 1936